The Ax–Kochen theorem, named for James Ax and Simon B. Kochen, states that for each positive integer d there is a finite set Yd of prime numbers, such that if p is any prime not in Yd then every homogeneous polynomial of degree d over the p-adic numbers in at least d2 + 1 variables has a nontrivial zero.

The proof of the theorem
The proof of the theorem makes extensive use of methods from mathematical logic, such as model theory.

In other words,  every homogeneous polynomial of degree d with more than d2 variables has a non-trivial zero (so Fp((t)) is a C2 field).

Then one shows that if two Henselian valued fields have equivalent valuation groups and residue fields, and the residue fields have characteristic 0, then they are elementarily equivalent (which means that a first order sentence is true for one if and only if it is true for the other).

Next one applies this to two fields, one given by an ultraproduct over all primes of the fields Fp((t)) and the other given by an ultraproduct over all primes of the p-adic fields Qp.
Both residue fields are given by an ultraproduct over the fields Fp, so are isomorphic and have characteristic 0, and both value groups are the same, so the ultraproducts are elementarily equivalent. (Taking ultraproducts is used to force the residue field to have characteristic 0; the residue fields of Fp((t))
and Qp both have non-zero characteristic p.)

The elementary equivalence of these ultraproducts implies that for any sentence in the language of valued fields, there is a finite set Y of exceptional primes, such that for any p not in this set the sentence is  true for Fp((t)) if and only if it is true for the field of p-adic numbers. Applying this to the sentence stating that every non-constant homogeneous polynomial of degree d in at least d2+1 variables represents 0, and using Lang's theorem, one gets the Ax–Kochen theorem.

Alternative proof
Jan Denef found a purely geometric proof for a conjecture of Jean-Louis Colliot-Thélène which generalizes the Ax–Kochen theorem.

Exceptional primes
Emil Artin conjectured this theorem with the finite exceptional set Yd being empty (that is, that all p-adic fields are C2), but Guy Terjanian found the following  2-adic counterexample for d = 4. Define

 

Then G has the property that it is 1 mod 4 if some x is odd, and 0 mod 16 otherwise. It follows easily from this that  the homogeneous form

G(x) + G(y) + G(z) + 4G(u) + 4G(v) + 4G(w)

of degree d = 4 in 18 > d2 variables  has no non-trivial zeros over the 2-adic integers.

Later  Terjanian showed that for each prime p and multiple d > 2 of p(p − 1), there is a form over the p-adic numbers of degree d with more than d2 variables but no nontrivial zeros. In other words, for all d > 2, Yd contains all primes p such that  p(p − 1) divides d.

 gave an explicit but very large bound for the exceptional set of primes p. If the degree d is 1, 2, or 3 the exceptional set is empty.  showed that if d = 5 the exceptional set is bounded by 13, and  showed that for d = 7 the exceptional set is bounded by 883 and for d = 11 it is bounded by 8053.

See also
Brauer's theorem on forms
Quasi-algebraic closure

Notes

References

  (Corollary 5.4.19)

Model theory
Theorems in number theory